The War in Abkhazia in 1998 took place in the Gali district of Abkhazia, after ethnic Georgians launched an insurgency against the Abkhazian separatist government. The conflict is sometimes referred to as the Six-Day War of Abkhazia; however, this name only takes into account the Abkhazian offensive that lasted from 20 to 26 May 1998, while hostilities and insurgent attacks had already occurred before that date.

Timeline 
In the eighteen months prior to the war, Georgian paramilitary forces systematically attacked both Russian peacekeeping troops and the Abkhazian military.

In the beginning of May, 300 fighters from the Georgian paramilitary White Legion crossed into Abkhazia, whereupon the Abkhazian government placed its military on combat alert. The White Legion was said to have received orders from Tamaz Nadareishvili, head of Georgia's government in exile for Abkhazia and member of Georgia's Security Council. In addition, Tornike Berishvili, a leader of the Mkhedrioni, declared on 27 May that 100 of its men had also fought in Abkhazia. According to Georgian sources, on 2 and 3 May Georgian forces gained control of the villages of Saberio, near the Inguri Dam, and Khumushkuri, and killed six Abkhazian soldiers when Abkhazian forces tried to retake the two villages. On 12 May, Georgian MP Germane Patsatsia announced that he was resigning to join the Georgian guerillas in Abkhazia who he claimed had seized control of Gali District.

On 18 May Georgian forces killed about twenty Abkhazian policemen in a surprise attack in the village of Repi. The next day, Abkhazian troops carried out reprisal attacks, resulting in ten to thirty deaths and causing Georgian residents to flee across the border. The following days saw minor, sporadic clashes as the Abkhazian Interior Ministry sent 800 more men into Gali District. Abkhazian forces were reported to set fire to Georgian homes.

On 22 May, the two sides signed a cease-fire agreement in Tbilisi, which was broken that same day when fighting broke out in the village of Tskhiri, killing four people. The next three days saw fierce fighting, with ITAR-TASS reporting the death of 40 Abkhazian soldiers, 4 Georgian soldiers and more than 20 Georgian civilians.

On 25 May, the Georgian and Abkhazian foreign ministers signed another cease-fire agreement in Gagra, set to take effect at 6:00 the following day, but fighting continued. In the night of 26 to 27 May, Abkhazian forces expelled the last Georgian guerillas.

Georgia's opposition blamed President Eduard Shevardnadze for losing the war by not supporting the guerillas with the Georgian Military. Shevardnadze declared that one of the reasons he had not sent in the military was it was not combat-ready.

References 

1998 in Abkhazia
Conflicts in 1998
Abkhaz–Georgian conflict
May 1998 events in Asia